Nikolay Fyodorovich Shcherbina (– ) was a 19th-century Russian poet.

Nikolay Shcherbina was born in the Mius district of the Don Cossack Host in the mansion of his mother. His father was of Ukrainian descent, and his mother of Greek and Don Cossack descent. His parents moved to the city of Taganrog, populated by Greek and Italian colonists. This influenced his aesthetic feelings and acquainted him with the Greek way of life and popular legends. Shcherbina studied at the Taganrog Boys Gymnasium (Chekhov Gymnasium), where he fell in love with Greek language lessons and wrote the long poem Sappho at the age of thirteen.

In 1838, his work To the Sea was published for the first time in the magazine Syn Otechestva (Son of the Fatherland). In 1850, a collection of his poems, Grecheskie stikhotvoreniya (Greek Verses), was published in Odessa and was well received by the public. Shcherbina moved to Moscow the same year, where he worked as assistant to the chief editor of Moskovskie Vedomosti and published poems in various journals from Moscow and Saint Petersburg. In 1854, he moved to Saint Petersburg, where he was appointed Official for Special Missions at the Ministry of Public Education. In the capital, he published Pchela (Bee), a collection of verses for popular reading, which was approved by the Ministry and improved his financial means. In 1857, his complete works in two volumes and Collection of the Best Russian Poems were published. In 1860–1869, he served at the Ministry of Internal Affairs.

References

1821 births
1869 deaths
Russian male poets
Russian people of Greek descent
Russian people of Ukrainian descent
19th-century poets
19th-century male writers from the Russian Empire
Burials at Tikhvin Cemetery